See Marmoutier Abbey (Tours) for the former abbey in Tours.

Marmoutier is a commune in the Bas-Rhin département in Grand Est in north-eastern France. The origin of the place is the former Marmoutier Abbey, of which the abbey church still serves as the parish church.

Geography
Marmoutier is a town of 2,712 inhabitants, in the northwest of Alsace, located between Saverne and Wasselonne and approximately 30 kilometers away from Strasbourg.

History
In 590 St. Leonhard, a disciple of Columbanus, founded a benedictine monastery which later was named after the abbot Maurus who modified it in the 12th century imitating the style of Hirsau. The church dates from this time. Above all the cloister flourished during the 14th century. In 1792 it disintegrated during the French Revolution.

Jacob Frey, a writer, lived in Marmoutier from 1545 as town chronicler and notary.

Sights
The church of Marmoutier Abbey from the 11th century holds a pipe organ by the organ builder Andreas Silbermann. Église Saint-Blaise de Sindelsberg  was built in 1584 and underwent renovation work in 1872.

See also
 Communes of the Bas-Rhin department

References

Communes of Bas-Rhin